

Ceolmund was a medieval Bishop of Rochester. He was consecrated between 893 and 900. He died between 909 and 926.

Citations

References

External links
 

Bishops of Rochester
10th-century English bishops
10th-century deaths
Year of birth unknown
9th-century English bishops